The Mildura Cultivator (1888–1920) was a weekly newspaper, the second newspaper to be published in Mildura, Victoria.

History
It was first published on Thursday 19 May 1888 as the official organ of Chaffey Brothers, founders of the irrigation settlement. The paper later went to bi-weekly, published on Wednesdays and Saturdays.

The Mildura Cultivator, Merbein Irrigationist and  Mildura Telegraph were amalgamated in 1920 to be replaced by the Sunraysia Daily, whose managing editor was Harry J. Stephens, well known as "Uncle Wiseman" of the Farmer and Settler. The last edition was published on 29 September 1920.

Personalities
(Samuel) Gifford Hall (1864–), who wrote as "Steele Blayde", was a noted horticulture and features writer, whose first article for the Cultivator was published on 24 August 1912.

References

External links 
 
Digitised World War I Victorian newspapers from the State Library of Victoria

Defunct newspapers published in Victoria (Australia)
Publications established in 1888
Mildura